Georgios Eleftheriou (born 30 September 1984 in Nicosia) is a retired Cypriot defender.

Eleftheriou announced his retirement at the end of the 2018-19 season.

References

External links
 

1984 births
Living people
Cypriot footballers
Cyprus international footballers
Association football midfielders
Cypriot First Division players
APOEL FC players
Digenis Akritas Morphou FC players
Nea Salamis Famagusta FC players
Doxa Katokopias FC players
AEL Limassol players
PAEEK players
ASIL Lysi players